Rhodopteriana funebris is a moth in the family Eupterotidae. It was described by Rothschild in 1917. It is found in Ethiopia.

References

Moths described in 1917
Janinae